The Arsenyevka (formerly Daubi-He ) is a left tributary of the Ussuri in Anuchinsky and Yakovlevsky Districts of Primorsky Krai, Russia.

It rises on the western slope in the southwestern region of the Sikhote-Alin mountain range.

The largest inhabited localities on the river are Anuchino, Arsenyev, and Yakovlevka.

External links
Arsenyevka River - Britannica Online Encyclopedia

References

Rivers of Primorsky Krai